In applied probability, an assemble-to-order system is a model of a warehouse operating a build to order policy where products are assembled from components only once an order has been made.
The time to assemble a product from components is negligible, but the time to create components is significant (for example, they must be ordered from a supplier).

Research typically focuses on finding good policies for inventory levels and on the impact of different configurations (such as having more shared parts). The special case of only one product is an assembly system, the case of just once component is a distribution system.

Model definition

Single period model

This case is a generalisation of the newsvendor model (which has only one component and one product). The problem involves three stages and we give one formation of the problem below

 components acquired
 demand realized
 components allocated, products produced

We use the following notation

In the final stage when demands are known the optimization problem faced is to 

and we can therefore write the optimization problem at the first stage as

with x0 representing the starting inventory vector and c the cost function for acquiring the components.

Continuous time

In continuous time orders for products arrive according to a Poisson process and the time required to produce components are independent and identically distributed for each component. Two problems typically studied in this system are to minimize the expected backlog of orders subject to a constraint on the component inventory, and to minimize the expected component inventory subject to constraints on the rate at which orders must be completed.

References

Inventory optimization